The Gonâve Island worm snake (Typhlops gonavensis) is a species of snake in the Typhlopidae family.

References

Further reading
 Richmond ND. 1964. The Blind Snakes (Typhlops) of Haiti with Descriptions of Three New Species. Breviora (202): 1–12. ("Typhlops gonavensis sp. nov.", pp. 3–4, Figure 2).
 Schwartz A, Thomas R. 1975. A Check-list of West Indian Amphibians and Reptiles. Special Publication No. 1. Pittsburgh, Pennsylvania: Carnegie Museum of Natural History. 216 pp. ("Typhlops capitulata gonavensis ", p. 197).

Typhlops
Reptiles described in 1964